Caladium lindenii 'Magnificum' is a cultivar of the species Caladium lindenii. It is differentiated from this species by having more pronounced veins on the leaves that are a creamy white coloration. The cultivar grows from a rhizome and is commonly grown as an ornamental plant.

References

lindenii 'Magnificum'
Ornamental plant cultivars